Adrienne Burgess (born 20 November 1947) is a UK-based Australian actress, mainly seen  on British television and resident in the UK.

Her acting credits include: Doctor Who (in the serial The Sun Makers), Blake's 7, Terry and June, Just Good Friends, Dickens of London, The Bill, and the 1981 film Priest of Love. She is married to actor Martin Cochrane.

References

External links

official website; accessed 11 May 2014.

1947 births
Living people
British television actresses
Australian television actresses
Australian expatriate actors
Australian expatriates in England
Actresses from Queensland
Place of birth missing (living people)